Ernest Fage (born August 15, 1953) is a Canadian politician who represented the electoral district of Cumberland North in the Nova Scotia House of Assembly from 1997 to 2009.

First elected as a Progressive Conservative in a 1997 by-election, Fage served various cabinets as Minister of Agriculture and Fisheries, Minister of Economic Development, Minister of Human Resources, Minister of responsible for the Public Service Commission, Minister of Emergency Management, Minister of Natural Resources, and Minister of Energy.

Fage was forced to take a leave of absence from the party caucus in January 2007 after allegations that he had engaged in criminal behaviour following a car accident on November 24, 2006. Fage was subsequently charged criminally with leaving the scene of an accident. Witnesses reported that Fage smelled of alcohol at the time of the accident, but he was not charged with an alcohol-related offense due to lack of evidence.

He was found guilty of leaving the scene of an accident, and fined $800, on December 18, 2007, and it was subsequently announced he would not be allowed back into caucus. Prior to the verdict Fage said he planned on running in the next election. He continued to sit as an independent MLA until the 2009 election, when he was defeated by Brian Skabar — notably, however, Fage finished in second place ahead of Keith Hunter, his replacement as the Progressive Conservative candidate.

Nine months before the accident, Fage was also involved in a controversy around a government loan to a potato farm with which he had a personal business connection.  As a result, he resigned from his cabinet post as Minister of Economic Development.

References

1953 births
Progressive Conservative Association of Nova Scotia MLAs
Nova Scotia Independent MLAs
Living people
People from Cumberland County, Nova Scotia
Members of the Executive Council of Nova Scotia
21st-century Canadian politicians
Farmers from Nova Scotia